William Milne (1873 – 10 January 1951) was an English amateur footballer and minor counties cricketer.

Milne was born at Newcastle upon Tyne. He began his career with Bedlington, Science & Art and Rutherford College. He had a brief professional football career, making six appearances in the Football League for Newcastle United between 1894 and 1897. He had two spells at Newcastle, separated by a brief spell at Sunderland.

Milne also played cricket at minor counties level for Northumberland, albeit intermittently, from 1896 to 1908, making nineteen appearances in the Minor Counties Championship. Outside of his sporting life, Milne worked for the Newcastle Corporation's Health Department for 44 years, as well as being one of the founders of the Newcastle Society of Artists. He died at Newcastle upon Tyne in January 1951.

References

1873 births
1951 deaths
Footballers from Newcastle upon Tyne
English footballers
Newcastle United F.C. players
Sunderland A.F.C. players
English cricketers
Northumberland cricketers
Association football outside forwards
English Football League players
Cricketers from Newcastle upon Tyne